Ardra may refer to:

 Kingdom of Ardra, a former West African kingdom
 Amplified Ribosomal DNA Restriction Analysis, a molecular biology technique
 Ardra, a continent in the video game War of the Visions: Final Fantasy Brave Exvius
 Ardra, a nakshatra (lunar mansion) in Hindu astrology
 Ardra, the villain in the Star Trek: The Next Generation episode "Devil's Due"

See also
 Ardara (disambiguation)